The Port Arthur Cross or Cross for the Defence of Port Arthur (Russian - Крест «За Порт-Артур») was a medal awarded by the Russian Empire. It was instituted on 14 January 1914 to mark the tenth anniversary of the siege of Port Arthur. It was awarded in silver to officers and in bronze to the other ranks.

The ends of the cross are broad in the manner of a St George Cross, with crossed swords in the centre with their points upwards, with a black battleship silhouette on a white enamel background at the centre on the silver issue and engraved on the bronze issue. On the left arm is "ПОРТЪ" ("PORT") and on the right arm is "АРТУРЪ" ("ARTHUR"). The reverse has a pin for attaching it to clothing.

External links
 http://awards.netdialogue.com/Russia/Empire/PA/PA.htm

1914 establishments in the Russian Empire
Russo-Japanese War
Military awards and decorations of Russia